Cave Island is an island marked by a large cavern in its south side, which is the second largest of the Meade Islands lying in the north entrance to McFarlane Strait, off Archar Peninsula on Greenwich Island in the South Shetland Islands.  It is separated from neighbouring Zverino Island to the west-southwest by the 110 m wide Glogovo Passage.

The name Cave Rock appears to have been applied by DI personnel on the Discovery II who charted the feature in 1935.

See also 
 List of Antarctic and sub-Antarctic islands

Maps
 L.L. Ivanov et al. Antarctica: Livingston Island and Greenwich Island, South Shetland Islands. Scale 1:100000 topographic map. Sofia: Antarctic Place-names Commission of Bulgaria, 2005.
 L.L. Ivanov. Antarctica: Livingston Island and Greenwich, Robert, Snow and Smith Islands. Scale 1:120000 topographic map.  Troyan: Manfred Wörner Foundation, 2009.

References
 SCAR Composite Antarctic Gazetteer
 

Islands of the South Shetland Islands